Rebecca Rasmussen is a fiction writer. She was born in Highland Park, Illinois and spent her youth in Wisconsin. She presently lives in California.

Biography
Rasmussen was raised in Spring Green, Wisconsin. When she was very young, her parents divorced, with the result that she spent a considerable portion of her growing years in Northfield, Illinois as well. Rasmussen has four brothers.

Rasmussen began writing early. Her short stories have appeared in TriQuarterly and Mid-American Review magazines. She was a finalist in the 30 Below contest of Narrative Magazine. She was also a finalist in the Family Matters contest of Glimmer Train magazine.

Rasmussen received a BA degree from Colorado State University and Master's degrees from the University of Massachusetts Amherst and Penn State University. It was during the UMass coursework that she completed her first novel, which was published as The Bird Sisters two years later, on 12 April 2011.

Rasmussen has taught writing at Penn State University, University of Massachusetts Amherst, Fontbonne University, Washington University in St. Louis, and The University of California, Los Angeles.

Rasmussen is married and has a daughter and son.

Bibliography
The Bird Sisters (April 2011) 304 p. Crown, hardcover (9780307717962) 
Her second novel EVERGREEN, was published by Knopf in 2014 and was a BookPage Best Book of the Year.
Represented by Michelle Brower, Aevitas Creative Management.

References

Year of birth missing (living people)
Living people
Colorado State University alumni
21st-century American novelists
American women novelists
American women short story writers
University of Massachusetts Amherst alumni
Pennsylvania State University alumni
American women essayists
21st-century American women writers
21st-century American short story writers
21st-century American essayists
People from Highland Park, Illinois
People from Northfield, Illinois
People from Spring Green, Wisconsin
Washington University in St. Louis faculty
Fontbonne University faculty
University of California, Los Angeles faculty